Szász or Szasz is a surname. Notable people with the surname include:

Emese Szász, Hungarian épée fencer
Endre Szász, Hungarian graphic artist
János Szász, Hungarian film director
János Saxon-Szász, Hungarian painter
Otto Szász, Hungarian mathematician
Robert Szasz, American real estate developer
Thomas Szasz, Hungarian-American psychiatrist
Tibor Szász, Hungarian classical pianist
Kitti Szász, Hungarian freestyle football world champion

See also
Szász–Mirakyan operator, a method for producing a Bernstein approximant
Szász–Mirakjan–Kantorovich operator, a generalization of the same
Müntz–Szász theorem, a generalization of the Weierstrass approximation theorem

Hungarian-language surnames